Skin: Talking About Sex, Class And Literature is a collection of essays written by award-winning author Dorothy Allison. Published in 1994, the book contains original essays as well as updated versions of essays that appeared in anthologies and magazines like New York Native, The Village Voice, and Forum. As the title suggests, Allison gives the reader her take on her difficult childhood, race- and class-based schisms within the lesbian community, feminism, pornography, sadomasochism, and the transcending effect that literature can have on children.

List of essays 
 Context
 A Question of Class
 Never Expected To Live Forever
 Gun Crazy
 Shotgun Strategies
 What Do We See? What Do We Not See?
 Neighbors
 Not As a Stranger
 Sex Writing, the Importance and the Difficulty
 Puritans, Perverts, and Feminists
 Public Silence, Private Terror
 Her Body, Mine, and His
 The Theory and the Practice of the Strap-on Dildo
 Conceptual Lesbianism
 Talking To Straight People
 Femme
 Sex Talk
 Believing in Literature
 A Personal History of Lesbian Porn
 Myths and Images
 Bertha Harris, a Memoir
 Survival Is the Least of My Desires
 Skin, Where She Touches Me
 Promises

Reviews 
Sobriquet Magazine wrote: "In all, Skin: Talking about Sex, Class and Literature serves as a revealing and important work for scholars of working-class studies, feminism and gender politics, and queer theory...Allison’s collection is an interesting and personal look at the complexities of her identity formation, and the levels on which she engages each category of self is both honest and sometimes painful. What shapes Allison’s writing is not only her recognition of Self and need for Truth, but admittance to all facets of her identity." Publishers Weekly noted that the book was "impassioned, personal and highly intelligent, Allison's collection of published writings and addresses examines issues of class and sexuality through the intricate lenses of autobiography and the literary experience."

Editions 
 Allison, Dorothy. Skin: Talking About Sex, Class, and Literature, Firebrand Books, 1994.

References 

1994 non-fiction books
American essay collections
Anti-classism
BDSM literature
Feminism and BDSM
Feminism and social class
Lesbian feminist books
Lesbian non-fiction books
Non-fiction books about racism
Stonewall Book Award-winning works
Working class in the United States
Working-class literature
Working-class feminism
Works about classism
1990s LGBT literature
Lesbian working-class culture
LGBT literature in the United States